Kelmash Devi, better known as Mannat Noor, is an Indian singer singing primarily in the Punjabi language. She has sung songs for films including Laung Laachi, Carry On Jatta 2, Sonu Ke Titu Ki Sweety and National Award winning Harjeeta. Her song Laung Laachi  is the first Indian song to reach 1 billion views on YouTube.

Career
Noor gained widespread popularity after she sang the title track of the film Laung Laachi which garnered critical acclaim. She contributed her voice to other tracks on the soundtrack for the movie. She has also sung many Punjabi songs such as "Makeup" and "Reshmi Chunni".

She has also supported Punjabi singer Ammy Virk on his concert tour,"Background Tour" in Australia.

Television

Discography

Film songs

Punjabi

Hindi

Non-Film Songs

As featured artist

References

External links
 
 

Living people
1991 births
Punjabi-language singers
Punjabi singers
Indian women singers
Punjabi people